Mandy Lowe (born 1 January 1970) is a former England women's international footballer. Her greatest achievement was playing in the winning games of the 1988 WFA Cup Final and 1994 FA Women's Cup Final with Doncaster Belles.

Honours
Doncaster Belles
 FA Women's Cup: 1988, 1994
 Runners up 2000

Bibliography

References

1970 births
Living people
English women's footballers
Doncaster Rovers Belles L.F.C. players
FA Women's National League players
England women's international footballers
Women's association football defenders